It's Not Enough to be Loud, You Have to Suck to. is the debut recording of Hullabaloo, released through their own Gawdawful Records label in 1988. According to an anecdote on the band's Facebook page, the misspelling of the final "to" in the title is intentional; the title comes from an epithet written on the wall of the bathroom in the band's practice space. The band assumed this was directed at them, as their practice room was adjacent to the bathroom. They copied the graffito verbatim and used it as the title for the EP.

The band clearly emerges from the post-hardcore scene inhabited by such bands as Killdozer, Scratch Acid and the Butthole Surfers. They experiment with unusual instrumentation—distorted amplified trumpet, saxophone, and Wurlitzer electric piano are present here—and unusual song forms.

Regurgitator is the CD reissue of It's Not Enough to be Loud... It was released in 1993 by Musical Tragedies. In addition to the six tracks on It's Not Enough to be Loud... it includes several unreleased studio tracks recorded around the same time, and covers of In the Dark by Toots and the Maytals, Breaking the Law by Judas Priest, Hole Lotta Rosie by AC/DC and a live recording of New York Groove made famous by Ace Frehley. While the unreleased tracks are not as complete or polished as the others, they show further experimentation with unusual instrumentation, song forms and time. Regurgitator specific tracks are listed as such below.

Critical reception
"Atonal cacophony the permeate a brooding, post-punkish structure, with such inspirations as Killdozer, Flipper and The Stooges hovering over, yet this glorious explosion is hardly what I'd call derivative..." -- Suburban Voice

"Now here is one of the what I truly consider truly consider to be one of the best rock 'n roll records I have heard in quite a while." -- Chemical Castration

"Real moments of musical entropy here..." -- XXX Fanzine

"As much as I hate doing this to someone as good and original, if you like KILLDOZER and THE BUTTHOLE SURFERS, check these guys out." -- Maximum Rocknroll

"This stuff sucks just fine, thanks." -- Option Magazine

"Chow time, dickweed." -- Forced Exposure

Track listing

Regurgitator additional tracks

Personnel as listed on It's Not Enough to be Loud 
Hullabaloo
Tango Quebec - Hands and Mouth
Delta Charlie - Guitar Salad Sandwich & Larynx
Juno Quebec - Deadweight
Papa Foxtrot - Nougat Base
Engineering and Additional Personnel
Jeff Landrock - Engineer
Harry Brown II - Engineer
J.J. Gonson - photography

Personnel and Credits as listed on Regurgitator 
Tom Quinn Jr - Vocals on 2,6,13,14,15; All Horns; All Keyboards
Sluggo - Vocals on 1,3,4,5,7,8,9,11,12; Guitar
John Quinn - All Drums
Pete Foley - Bass on 1,2,3,6,7,9,13,14; Lead Guitar on 9
Lloyd Dyson - Bass on 4,5,10,11,12,15; Vocals on 10
Engineering and additional personnel
Jeff Landrock - Engineer
Harry Brown II - Engineer
J.J. Gonson - photography
Sluggo - design
Edwin DeShazo - Mixing, tracks 7,8,9,12,13,14
Granny - Engineer, track 15

References

External links 
 
 

1988 albums
Hullabaloo (band) albums